Clarina is a genus of moths in the family Sphingidae first described by J. W. Tutt in 1903.

Species
Clarina kotschyi (Kollar, 1849)
Clarina syriaca (Lederer, 1855)

References

Macroglossini
Moth genera
Taxa named by J. W. Tutt